The soundtrack of the TV series Sacred Games consists of 24 tracks including seven songs and other scores. One song "Kaam 25" sung and written by rapper Divine and music by the producer Phenom, was released on 21 June 2018. It was not used in the series. According to Sidhantha Jain of Firstpost, the song is a "hard-hitting, hypnotic Mumbai anthem inspired by the streets." One of Divine's earlier song "Jungli Sher", was also used in the series' trailer. The background score and the opening theme was composed by Alokananda Dasgupta and Yashraj Jaiswal. She also composed four songs in it: "Saiyaan", "Tabahi", "Dhuaan Dhuaan" and "Kukoo's Couplet". Both Dasgupta and Motwane came up with the idea that the theme "should have a religious connotation but it shouldn't remind one of any particular religion". She then created gibberish lines after deciding to include an ominous chant by humming with a vocalist to record with a cello. Rachita Arora composed two tracks of the album, "Dance Capital" and "Labon Se Chhukar." She was briefed by Kashyap to listen to the songs of Bappi Lahiri to get a "sense of the infectious rhythm that defined his music." The Music Production of the songs were done by Daniel Chiramal and the lyrics for the songs were written by Rajeshwari Dasgupta, Prakhar Mishra Varunendra, Vishal Sawant and Rajeshwari Deshpande.

Track listing

Music videos
Netflix released the music video of the track "Kaam 25" on YouTube featuring Divine.

References

2018 soundtrack albums
Films scored by Alokananda Dasgupta
Films scored by Divine
Films scored by Rachita Arora
Films scored by Yashraj Jaiswal